Chu, also spelled Choo, is a Korean family name and an element in Korean given names. Its meaning depends on the hanja used to write it.

Family name

Overview
The 2000 South Korean Census found 55,309 people with the family name Chu. It could be written with either of two hanja, indicating different lineages. A study by the National Institute of the Korean Language based on year 2007 application data for South Korean passports found that 55.1% of applicants with this surname chose to spell it in Latin letters as "Chu" in their passports, while 43.1% spelled it as "Choo".

Hanja meaning "autumn" (秋)
This character was originally used to write the Chinese family name now pronounced Qῑu in Mandarin. According to the 2000 Census, 54,667 people in 17,142 households had this family name, making it the 64th-most common family name out of 287 family names distinguished by the census.

Hanja meaning "State of Zou" (鄒)
This character was originally used to write the Chinese family name now pronounced Zōu in Mandarin, and before that the name of the historical State of Zou. Though Zōu is a fairly widespread family name in China, where a 2007 survey found it to be the country's 67th-most common family name, the same character is very rarely used as a Korean family name; the 2000 South Korean census found only 642 people in 209 households who used this character to write their family name, making it the country's 190th-most common family name. None of them reported their bon-gwan.

People
People with the family name Chu or Choo include:

Chu Hwa-il (born 1932), South Korean sport shooter
Chunghi Choo (born 1938), South Korean jewelry designer and metalsmith 
Chu Song-woong (1941–1985), South Korean actor
Choo Byung-jik (born 1949), South Korean politician
Choo Chang-min (born 1966), South Korean film director
Chu Ga-yeoul (born 1968), South Korean singer
Chu Sang-mi (born 1973), South Korean actress
Choo Seung-gyun (born 1974), South Korean retired basketball player and coach
Yoshihiro Akiyama (also known as Choo Sung-hoon, born 1975), Zainichi Korean mixed martial artist
Chu Ki-young (born 1977), South Korean javelin thrower
Alex Chu (born Chu Hun-gon, 1979), South Korean-born Canadian singer
Choo Ja-hyun (born 1979), South Korean actress
Shin-Soo Choo (born 1982), South Korean baseball player in U.S. Major League Baseball
Chu Jung-hyun (born 1988), South Korean football player
Choo Young-woo (born 1999), South Korean actor
Chu Ye-jin (born 2001), South Korean actress

As given name element
There are 23 hanja with the reading "Chu", and a variant form of one of those, on the South Korean government's official list of hanja which may be registered for use in given names; they are:

 (가을 추 gaeul chu): "autumn"
 (쫓을 추 jjocheul chu): "to chase"
 (밀 추 mil chu): "to push"
 (뽑을 추 bbobeul chu): "to pluck"
 (추할 추 chuhal chu): "ugly"
 (가래나무 추 garaenamu chu): "Juglans mandshurica tree"
 (지도리 추 jidori chu): "hinge"
 (추나라 추 chunara chu): "State of Zou"
 (송곳 추 song-got chu): "awl"
 (저울추 추 geoulchu chu): "a weight"
 (떨어질 추 ddeoreojil chu): "to fall"
 (등골 추 deung-gol chu): "backbone"
 (다할 추 dahal chu)
 (주름 추 jureum chu): "wrinkle"
 (꼴 추 ggol chu): "fodder"
 (사철쑥 추 sacheolssuk chu): "mugwort"
 (물을 추 mureul chu): "to ask"
 (달아날 추 daranal chu): "to run"
 (우두머리 추 udumeori chu): "boss"
 (쇠망치 추) soemangchi chu): "metal bar"
 (병아리 추 byeong-ari chu): "chick'
 (마부 추 mabu chu): "groom"
 (미꾸라지 추 migguraji chu): "loach"	
 (variant)

References

Korean-language surnames